Mimophis mahfalensis, also known as the common big-eyed snake, is a species of snake in the family Psammophiidae. It is endemic to Madagascar and occurs in the central and southern parts of the island; the northern population has been split off as a separate species, Mimophis occultus.

Two subspecies are recognized:

References 

Psammophiidae
Snakes of Africa
Reptiles of Madagascar
Endemic fauna of Madagascar
Taxa named by Alfred Grandidier
Reptiles described in 1867